Kuteena is a village in the Neemrana subdistrict of the Alwar District in the state of Rajasthan in India. It is located in the foothills of Aravali.

Location
Kuteena is located 10 km from Rajasthan's northeastern border with Haryana and 10 km from National Highway number 8 (NH-8) at Shahajahanpur.  The nearest railway station (Bawal) is 20 km away. This village is the holy land of Baba Kundandas maharaj. Kuteena is surrounded by Siryaani to the south, Gugalkota to the west, Giglana to the east, and Kaankar & Rajgarh to the north.  It is in a valley amidst the Aravalli Range. The region of Neemrana (including Kuteena) and Behror was earlier entitled as Rath are due to their culture and language was named Rathi after that, with their tag line as - Kath Nave Par Rath Nave Na.

History and demographics
Kuteena is a village of Rajpoot's Chauhan Kuteena was established by chauhans Rajputs  of Neemrana Thikana who make up majority of population. The Village is protected naturally with 2 hills on both sides.
Many villagers are serving or retired military personnel.
Many have won gallantry awards mainly being HAV Hazari singh who won Vir Chakra. . R.S. Chauhan was former rajasthan police DGP, Sultan Singh Chauhan (Asst Comdt.  CRPF), Lieutenant Commander (late) Ram Pratap Singh Chauhan decorated with Nau Sena Medal, Colonel Sardar Singh,  Additional District Magistrate Narender Chauhan . Baba Shiv Prasad's family have given a lot of fame to the village, his second son Retd. Capt. Mahaveer Prasad have 4 sons, eldest Retd DG Satish Sharma IPS from Gujarat he is staying in Surat in Gujarat. Second son Laxmi Kant Sharma is successful businessmen and settled in the United Kingdom, Third son Dr Nemi Kant is a famous Doctor in Delhi and the youngest son Col Ravi Sharma, after taking Premature Retirement from Army,  has been working as An Actor, Director, Script Writer & Military Advisor in Bollywood, Mumbai. His Wife Mrs Leena Sharma is winner of Mrs India Pacific Beauty Contest and is also an actor in Mumbai. Col. Omprakash Singh Chauhan was in Army Ordinance corps and his son Major Satpal Singh is in JAKLI centre. Capt. V. S. Chauhan son of Shri Harnath Singh ji is also in Indian Army. AGP of Rajasthan Br. Anangpal Singh Chauhan son of Gopi Singh ji and Mr. Narendra Singh, son of Mr. Sampat Singh ji, serving as District Agriculture Officer, Jaipur originate from Kuteena itself. 
Retired AGM from NABARD Shri K. S. Chauhan, son of Shri Hazari Singh ji Nambardar, his eldest son Dr. Vikram Singh, who is Deputy Director of Agriculture of Gujarat and his youngest son Mr. S. P. Singh Chauhan, regional head in NSE, Jaipur are also originated from here and renowned in the nearby regions. Advocate Sher Singh of Supreme court, son of BSF SI K. P. Singh and SBI Mgr. Ashok Singh, son of Mr. Amar Singh are some of the currently serving officials.
The first commissioned officer of Indian Army from Kuteena is Rtd. Capt. Ramjilal Singh Chauhan, son of Shri Rampal Singh ji and his younger brother, Mr. Ramdayal Singh is Chief Egr. in CPWD. Late Shri Ramcharan Singh son of Shri Kalu Singh was chief manager in Hotel Ashoka Delhi and the list goes on. 

Retd. Capt Mahaveer pasad have written a history of Kutina and history Chauhan, the printed copy will be available at Baba Kundan Das Temple.

Temples
Kuteena has many temples: Chauganan Mata, Jugni Mata, Durga Mata, Hanumanji, Thakur ji, Gogaji Maharaj, Santoshi Mata, Baba Kundan Das. The Temple of Dadi Jagni is also situated in village Kuteena, and also a temple of 1008 Baba Mohan Das is situated in village Kuteena.The temple of Saint Baba Kundandas and the Durga Mata Temple are located on a hilltop. Durga mata temple is being beautifully constructed into a complex. After completion it will contain a gufa, temple and park.  A memorial, Nau-Gaja was also built by the villagers in memory of the martyrs of a short time war of 1880s, held between them and the Maharaja of Neemrana at that time. It is worshiped by offering a white cloth of 2 and a quarter guz, namely chaddar, on auspicious occasions and major festivals like Holi and Diwali to show respect and gratitude.

Economy 
In the past, the economy of Kuteena was based mainly on agriculture but now it is also on Defence,  paramilitary and police services.  However, it has also now shifting towards business and industry.  Nearby industrial hubs like Gurgaon, Shahajahanpur, Neemrana, Behror, Bhiwadi, Khushkhera, ghiloth japanese zone 2 and Alwar employ many of the residents, leading to higher family incomes and living standards.

Culture 
Due to its location, the village culture has been influenced by Haryana. Rath is the main spoken language. The village has a diverse culture with a strong impact of Rajput culture. Most of the Hindu festivals are celebrated here. Holi, Deepawali, Gangaur are the major festivals. Baba Kundandas fair celebrated annually in the village along with sports events. Nowadays the marriages are done with the residents of Haryana which has also brought the culture of Haryana here.

References

External links

Villages in Alwar district